Luiza Novaes Tavares de Almeida (born 7 September 1991) is a Brazilian dressage rider. She represented Brazil at the 2008 Summer Olympics as youngest equestrian ever with an age of 16 and at the 2012 Summer Olympics in the individual dressage, finishing 47th. In 2016 she competed for the third time at the 2016 Summer Olympics in Rio de Janeiro.

References

1991 births
Living people
Brazilian female equestrians
Brazilian dressage riders
Olympic equestrians of Brazil
Equestrians at the 2008 Summer Olympics
Equestrians at the 2012 Summer Olympics
Equestrians at the 2016 Summer Olympics
Pan American Games bronze medalists for Brazil
Pan American Games medalists in equestrian
Equestrians at the 2007 Pan American Games
Medalists at the 2007 Pan American Games
Sportspeople from São Paulo
21st-century Brazilian women